The Mark Walberg Show (also titled mark., being named after the mark. line of cosmetics owned by Avon Products)  is an American syndicated tabloid talk show presented by Mark L. Walberg which aired from September 11, 1995 until May 31, 1996.

References

External links

1995 American television series debuts
1996 American television series endings
American television talk shows
First-run syndicated television programs in the United States
Television series by New World Television